Lubbock Ridge is a high ridge in Antarctica, about  long, extending west from Mount Wade and terminating in a steep bluff at the east side of Shackleton Glacier. It was named by F. Alton Wade, leader of the Texas Tech Shackleton Glacier Expedition (1962–63), in honor of Lubbock, the home of Texas Technological College, to which all three members of the party were affiliated.

References

Ridges of the Ross Dependency
Dufek Coast